KOJO "Radio Maria" is a non-commercial FM broadcasting station at 91.1 mHz in Lake Charles, Louisiana. Radio Maria USA airs Catholic programming.

History
KOJO is the first FM repeater of originating station KJMJ 580 AM in Alexandria, Louisiana. KOJO first came on the air on September 17, 2000. KOJO's signal reaches into a fringe area in portions of southeastern Texas, where afterward is covered by KDEI 1250 AM in Port Arthur...as well into portions of the Lafayette area..where KNIR 1360 AM in New Iberia compensates for KOJO's fringe area there.

Father Duane Stenzel O.F.M. (1927–2011) served as national program director from its 2000 beginnings until his death.

Mary Pyper is national board president, Joshua Danis is national coordinator and Frank Hare is studio and audio production manager.

Listeners outside KOJO's signal area can also listen online (or by Alexa, iPhone, BlackBerry and Android mobile phone devices by means of downloading the appropriate app) from Radio Maria's website.

See also
KJMJ
KBIO
KNIR
KDEI

External links
Official Radio Maria USA site (with streaming audio)
World Family of Radio Maria
Listing of Radio Maria's stations in the U.S. broadcasting in English,Spanish and Italian

Catholic radio stations
Radio stations established in 2000
2000 establishments in Louisiana
OJO (FM)
Christian radio stations in Louisiana